Joachim Gérard defeated Gordon Reid in the final, 6–2, 7–6(7–2) 
to win the gentlemen's singles wheelchair tennis title at the 2021 Wimbledon Championships.

Gustavo Fernández was the defending champion, but was defeated by Reid in the semifinals.

Seeds

Draw

Finals

References

Sources
WC Men's Singles

Men's Wheelchair Singles
Wimbledon Championship by year – Wheelchair men's singles